881 Naval Air Squadron (881 NAS) was a squadron of the British Royal Navy's Fleet Air Arm formed in June 1941. It served as a fighter squadron in the Second World War, taking part in the British invasion of Madagascar in 1942, in the Allied invasions of Northern France and Southern France in 1944, also taking part in operations in the Aegean Sea and off Norway before disbanding in October 1945.

The squadron was reformed in May 1951 as a carrier-based anti-submarine squadron in the Royal Canadian Navy. It was redesignated VS 881, in 1952 and was disbanded in 1959.

Royal Navy

881 Naval Air Squadron was first formed at RNAS Lee-on-Solent on 1 June 1941 as a fleet fighter squadron equipped with six Grumman Martlet I and IIs. In March 1942, its strength now increased to nine aircraft, the squadron first embarked aboard Illustrious as the carrier set out for the Indian Ocean. In May 1942, the squadron took part in the invasion of Madagascar, providing fighter cover and carrying out during the initial attacks on Diego Suarez, shooting down two Potez 63-11 reconnaissance bombers on 6 May and three Morane-Saulnier MS 406 fighters on 7 May (for the loss of one Martlet) in the only air-to-air combats of the campaign. On 19 May 1942, 882 Naval Air Squadron, the other Martlet-equipped squadron aboard Illustrious, merged with 881 Squadron. While the important port of Diego Suarez and environs were captured in May, the rest of Madagascar remained under Vichy French control, and on 10 September 1942, an offensive to take the rest of the island, with an amphibious landing at Majunga. Illustrious air wing, including 881 Squadron, covered the landings at Majunga on 10 September and Tamatave on 17 September.

881 Squadron disembarked from Illustrious when the carrier returned to British waters in February 1943. The squadron embarked on the carrier  in July 1943 as the carrier took part in Home Fleet sweeps off the coast of Norway to distract German attention from the Allied invasion of Sicily. The squadron claimed one German reconnaissance aircraft shot down during these operations. The squadron re-equipped with Wildcat V fighters in August 1943 and embarked on the Escort carrier  in November as the carrier worked up. In February Pursuer escorted convoys between Britain and Gibraltar, shooting down two German aircraft. On 3 April 1944, 881 Squadron took part in Operation Tungsten, a carrier strike against the German battleship  at Kaafjord in the far north of Norway. 881 Squadron's Wildcats, together with those of 882, 896 and 898 Squadrons, the Hellcats of 800 and 804 Squadrons and the Corsairs of 1834 and 1836 Squadrons, escorted the strike against Tirpitz. Later that month, Pursuer, with 881 Squadron aboard, took parts in raids against shipping off the coast of Norway.

In June 1944, Pursuer, with an airwing of 881 and 896 Squadrons, was deployed as part of the forces patrolling to protect the invasion forces during the Invasion of Normandy. The squadron then deployed aboard the escort carrier  for Operation Wanderer, an anti-submarine sweep off the coast of Norway designed to make the Germans believe that an invasion of Norway was immanent, to discourage them from withdrawing troops to Normandy. In July, the squadron re-embarked on Pursuer which departed for the Mediterranean, taking part in Operation Dragoon, the Allied invasion of Southern France, in August 1944. The squadron's Wildcats were used for reconnaissance and artillery spotting, as well as for dive bombing and combat air patrol duties during the invasion. The squadron flew 180 sorties over Southern France, with three Wildcats being lost as a result of enemy fire, two due to running out of fuel and two as a result of landing accidents. In September that year, Pursuer took part in Operation Outing, an offensive by the Royal Navy against German forces in the Aegean Sea. 881 Squadron carried out attack and reconnaissance missions, sinking a number of Caïques.

Pursuer returned to Britain in October with 881 Squadron, and in November, 881 Squadron, operating from Pursuer, took part in a number of operations against German shipping in Norwegian waters, sinking the German Vorpostenboot (patrol boat) V6413 off Trondheim on 14 November and escorting Grumman Avengers from the carrier  on a mine-laying mission on 20 November. Operations off Norway continued through January and February. 

In March 1945, the squadron took passage on Pursuer to Cape Town, arriving in April. where it replaced its Wildcats with Grumman Hellcat fighters in preparation for joining the British Pacific Fleet. The end of the year interrupted the squadron's work-up with its new aircraft, and it was disbanded on 27 October 1945.

Canada
The squadron was re-formed as an anti-submarine squadron of the Royal Canadian Navy on 1 May 1951, when, as part of a renumbering of Commonwealth Naval Air Squadrons, 826 Squadron was renumbered 881 Squadron. The squadron, equipped with Grumman TBM-3E Avengers, had a shore base of HCMS Shearwater, a Canadian Naval airbase at Dartmouth, Nova Scotia, and regularly deployed aboard the Canadian aircraft carrier . In November 1952, the squadron adopted the US Navy-like styling of VS 881 for its designation. In March 1955, a flight of four Avengers equipped for Airborne Early Warning was added, but in practice, the AEW Avengers were used to locate surface targets for the squadron's regular anti-submarine aircraft. The squadron re-equipped with Grumman CS2F-1 Trackers in February–March 1957, starting operations on Canada's new carrier, later that year. On 7 July 1959, VS 881 was disbanded when it was merged with VS 880, with the combined unit operating under the VS 880 designation.

Battle honours
The following Battle Honours have been awarded to 881 Naval Air Squadron.
 Atlantic 1939–45
 Norway 1940–5
 Diego Suarez 1942
 Aegean 1943–4
Normandy 1944
South France 1944

References

 
 
 
 
 
 
 
 

800 series Fleet Air Arm squadrons
Military units and formations established in 1941
Military units and formations of the Royal Navy in World War II